There are 70 extant churches and places of worship in the district of Lewes, one of five local government districts in the English county of East Sussex.  A further 21 former places of worship are no longer in religious use.  The area now covered by the district is mainly rural and characterised by small villages with ancient parish churches.  The riverside market town of Lewes, the port of Newhaven and the seaside towns of Seaford, Peacehaven and Telscombe Cliffs are the main urban areas and have higher concentrations of religious buildings.

Most residents of the district identify themselves as Christian, and there were no places of worship serving any other religious groups until a mosque and Islamic community centre opened in Seaford in 2017.  Many Christian denominations are represented—the town of Lewes in particular has a long-established history of Protestant Nonconformism—but the majority of churches serve the Church of England community.

Historic England or its predecessor English Heritage have awarded listed status to 43 of Lewes district's current and former places of worship.  A building is defined as "listed" when it is placed on a statutory register of buildings of "special architectural or historic interest" in accordance with the Planning (Listed Buildings and Conservation Areas) Act 1990. The Department for Digital, Culture, Media and Sport, a Government department, is responsible for this; Historic England, a non-departmental public body, acts as an agency of the department to administer the process and advise the department on relevant issues. There are three grades of listing status. Grade I, the highest, is defined as being of "exceptional interest"; Grade II* is used for "particularly important buildings of more than special interest"; and Grade II, the lowest, is used for buildings of "special interest".

Overview of Lewes and its places of worship

Lewes, the administrative centre of the district and the county town of East Sussex, lies inland in the centre of the district. The rest of the district is mostly rural. The city and unitary authority of Brighton and Hove lies to the southwest; the district of Mid Sussex, in the neighbouring county of West Sussex, is to the west; and Lewes's eastern boundary is with Wealden district.

The town of Lewes enjoys a strategic position on the River Ouse and surrounded by hills.  There is evidence of Anglo-Saxon habitation, and by the 10th century it had become the most important borough in Sussex. It was the administrative centre of the Rape of Lewes, one of the pre-Norman subdivisions of Sussex.  The rape was given by William the Conqueror to William de Warenne, 1st Earl of Surrey, who had become a major landowner by the time of the Domesday survey in 1086. The town has many surviving Anglican parish churches, of which St Anne's is the oldest. Others such as St Andrew's, St Martin's and St Mary-in-the-Market-Place declined and fell out of use by the Middle Ages, and their parishes were combined with others. Nonconformism has been established in the town for more than three centuries: Unitarians, Methodists, Quakers, Baptists, Strict Baptists, Presbyterians and Congregationalists all founded chapels in the 18th or 19th century, many of which are still in operation.  Ditchling and Wivelsfield also have long associations with Nonconformist worship. Outside the town of Lewes itself, most manors and villages had developed by the 12th century, and many of their associated churches date from that time—although the Victorian enthusiasm for church restoration had an effect throughout the district.

There was a church at Bishopstone in the 8th century, and "current scholarship advocates a date of  975" for the founding of the present St Andrew's Church, which retains much Saxon and Norman fabric. The nave of Southease church is 11th-century, and St John the Baptist's Church at Southover was built in the same century, albeit as a hospitium associated with the adjacent Lewes Priory. Some 11th-century fabric also survives at Wivelsfield, and the nave at Ditchling is of that period. Many Anglican churches in the district were built in the 12th century, as Norman architecture gave way to Early English Gothic.  Iford, Piddinghoe, Rodmell and Telscombe are wholly or mostly of that date; Barcombe, Beddingham, St Thomas-at-Cliffe Church at Cliffe, East Chiltington, Hamsey, Newhaven, Newick, Plumpton, Ringmer St Leonard's Church at Seaford and Westmeston retain some parts from that century (most commonly the nave).  The churches at Chailey, East Blatchington, St Michael's at Lewes, South Malling, Streat, Tarring Neville and West Firle have 13th-century origins, while St Pancras Church at Kingston-near-Lewes was built a century later. Glynde's parish church was rebuilt in a distinctive Palladian style in the 1760s, while the ruinous medieval church in Falmer was rebuilt in the early 19th century. New churches of the 19th century include St John sub Castro, Lewes (1839, replacing an 11th-century predecessor), Offham (1859), North Chailey (1876; closed), Spithurst (1880; closed) and Plumpton Green (1893). Increased residential development in the 20th century prompted the construction of more churches: at Peacehaven (1922; replaced by the present building in 1955), on the Nevill Estate in Lewes (1938), and in the Sutton area of Seaford (1959). A second church was also built in East Blatchington in the 1920s but has closed.

Roman Catholics in the Lewes area had to travel to Brighton to worship until the Lewes Mission was founded in 1865.  A chapel in a house was used at first, but on 25 January 1870 a permanent church dedicated to The Sacred Heart and St Pancras was built. It was a stone-built Early English Gothic Revival building designed by Carlos Crisford, who also designed Central Methodist Church, Eastbourne. It was replaced by the present St Pancras Church in 1939. A convent chapel was built in Newhaven in around 1878, but it was not until 20 years later that a permanent Catholic church was built there.  W. H. Romaine-Walker was the architect.  It was dedicated to The Sacred Heart and was opened on 2 January 1898 by the Bishop of Southwark Francis Bourne. The following year he built a house in nearby Seaford; it included a chapel dedicated to St Francis de Sales, which was open to the public from the beginning.  Priests from Newhaven served it at first. This oratory was succeeded by a permanent church, the Church of St Thomas More, in 1935. The present Church of the Immaculate Conception in Peacehaven was registered in 1963, replacing an earlier church.

The Methodist Statistical Returns published in 1947 recorded the existence of Methodist churches, all of Wesleyan origin and administered by the Sussex Mission, at Station Street in Lewes, Chapel Street in Newhaven and Seaford. The building in Lewes closed in 1973 and is now in commercial use; the congregation moved to Christ Church. Newhaven's chapel closed around the time the Returns were compiled, but a Methodist congregation subsequently began to share the Anglican parish church of St Michael and All Angels. Seaford's Methodist chapel was still used until 2016, when it was sold and the congregation moved into the town's United Reformed chapel following years of collaboration between the two denominations.  It is now owned by Kings Church Seaford, an Evangelical congregation.

General Baptists, Unitarians and Calvinistic and Strict Baptists have a long and interconnected history in the district.  A General Baptist congregation existed in Ditchling in the late 17th century, and a chapel was built  1730. A General Baptist chapel built in the Southover area of Lewes from 1741 was associated with it. The chapel at Ditchling became Unitarian later in the 18th century, and some members seceded and founded a new Strict Baptist chapel at Wivelsfield.  Bethel Chapel opened there in 1763 and is still in use. Westgate Chapel in Lewes, built  1700 for Presbyterians, also adopted Unitarian views in the 18th century, and members of Southover General Baptist Chapel joined in the early 19th century when their views changed in the same way.  The old chapel was converted into a house in the 1970s; Westgate Chapel remains in use as a Unitarian place of worship. Elsewhere in Lewes town centre, a General Baptist congregation became established in the town centre in 1818 and built the present much-altered Eastgate Baptist Church in 1843. Nearby, Jireh Chapel opened in 1805 for Independent Calvinistic Baptists and was extended in 1826. The cause declined in the 20th century, and the Free Presbyterian Church of Ulster has used it for worship since 1998. The present Jubilee Christian Centre in Barcombe, a modern building, is the successor to a Strict Baptist chapel founded in 1810. Other Calvinistic or Strict Baptist churches no longer in religious use can be found in Newick (1834), Ditchling (1867), Lewes (two buildings:  1860 and 1906) and Newhaven (1904). In the 20th century, Baptist churches were built in both Newhaven and Seaford in 1901. The original building at Newhaven still stands and is used as the church hall of the present church, opened in 1938. The chapel in Seaford town centre was demolished in 1973 for commercial development and was replaced by a new circular church building in the East Blatchington area of the town. The Countess of Huntingdon's Connexion, another Calvinist group with links to Methodism, is also represented in the district.  The founder of the group, Selina Hastings, Countess of Huntingdon, lived in Wivelsfield and opened a chapel there in 1778—only the second to be founded, and the oldest survivor (the first, opened in Brighton in 1761, has been demolished). Ote Hall Chapel remains in regular use. Another Connexion chapel founded around the same time in the Cliffe area of Lewes was demolished in the late 19th century.

The United Reformed Church was formed in 1972 by a merger between the Congregational Church and the Presbyterian Church of England.  Seaford Congregational Chapel opened in 1877 and is now the Cross Way Clinton Centre, a shared Methodist and United Reformed church; similarly, the joint Methodist and United Reformed Christ Church in Lewes opened in 1954 as Lewes Congregational Church. There is also a United Reformed Church at Telscombe Cliffs. Former Congregational chapels survive in Newhaven (1866–1938), South Heighton (1891–the mid-20th century) and Ringmer (1914–1995). There was also a Presbyterian chapel in Lewes: built in around 1870, it closed in the 1940s and is now in commercial use.

King's Church, an Charismatic Evangelical fellowship associated with the Newfrontiers movement, has congregations in Lewes and Seaford. Former mission halls in Ditchling, Newick and South Chailey remain in use by Evangelical congregations: Emmanuel Chapel in Ditchling is a replacement building registered in 1972, and Chailey Free Church's present building dates from 1992, but Newick Evangelical Free Church still occupies the original building of 1892. Other Evangelical churches have been registered in Peacehaven in 1966, replacing an earlier building, and the Sutton area of Seaford in 1969.

Quakers have met in Lewes since 1675, but their present meeting house dates from 1784 and has been altered and extended several times. In 1967 a permanent meeting house was established in Ditchling for Quakers in the area; it was a converted building which had had several secular uses. Jehovah's Witnesses have three Kingdom Halls in the district.  The hall at Station Street in Lewes was registered in 1987, replacing a building on Lancaster Street used since 1960 which had in turn succeeded an earlier hall registered in 1949 on Albion Street. The Kingdom Halls in Peacehaven and Seaford date from 1964 and 1983 respectively. A Pentecostal congregation affiliated with the Elim denomination founded a chapel in Newhaven in 1964. The Haywards Heath Chapel of the Church of Jesus Christ of Latter-day Saints opened in Wivelsfield in 1999.

Religious affiliation
According to the 2011 United Kingdom Census, 97,502 people lived in Lewes District.  Of these, 57% identified themselves as Christian, 0.57% were Muslim, 0.5% were Buddhist, 0.33% were Jewish, 0.26% were Hindu, 0.04% were Sikh, 0.62% followed another religion, 32.45% claimed no religious affiliation and 8.23% did not state their religion.  The proportion of Christians was lower than of England as a whole (59.38%).  Affiliation with Buddhism and faiths in the "any other religion" category was more widespread in the district: the corresponding figures for England were 0.45% and 0.43% respectively.  The proportion of people with no religious affiliation was also higher than the national figure of 24.74%.  The other religions had much lower proportions of followers than in England overall: the corresponding national percentages were 5.02% for Islam, 1.52% for Hinduism, 0.79% for Sikhism and 0.49% for Judaism.

Administration
All Anglican churches in Lewes district are part of the Diocese of Chichester, whose cathedral is at Chichester in West Sussex. Three archdeaconries—Chichester, Horsham, and Lewes and Hastings—make up the next highest level of administration; the district has at least one church in each.  St Laurence's Church in Falmer, which is part of a united parish with Stanmer Church across the border in the city of Brighton and Hove, is part of the Rural Deanery of Brighton, one of five deaneries in the Archdeaconry of Chichester. St Peter and St John the Baptist's Church at Wivelsfield is in the Rural Deanery of Cuckfield, and the churches at Ditchling, Streat and Westmeston are part of the Rural Deanery of Hurst; these are two of the eight deaneries in the Archdeaconry of Horsham. The Archdeaconry of Hastings, which also has eight deaneries, is responsible for all other Anglican churches in the district.  Except for the churches in Chailey and Newick, which are in the Rural Deanery of Uckfield, all are controlled by the Rural Deanery of Lewes and Seaford.

The Roman Catholic Diocese of Arundel and Brighton, whose cathedral is at Arundel, administers the four Roman Catholic churches in Lewes district.  The diocese has 11 deaneries, each with several churches. Lewes Deanery is responsible for St Pancras' Church at Lewes, the Church of the Sacred Heart in Newhaven, the Church of the Immaculate Conception in Peacehaven and St Thomas More Church in Seaford as well as three other churches the Mid Sussex district of West Sussex.

Eastgate Baptist Church in Lewes and the Baptist churches in Newhaven and Seaford are administratively part of the East Sussex Network of the South Eastern Baptist Association.  Baptist congregations affiliated to this network also meet in Peacehaven and Ringmer, but do not have their own church buildings: Coastlands Church in Peacehaven is based at Peacehaven Community School, and Ringmer Baptist Church uses Ringmer village hall.

The Central Sussex United Area, an ecumenical partnership between the Methodist Church and the United Reformed Church's Southern Synod, was formed in September 2007 to administer churches belonging to those denominations in an area bounded by Haywards Heath, Eastbourne and Crowborough. Within Lewes District, Christ Church in Lewes, Chyngton Methodist Church, Cross Way Church in Seaford and St Michael's Church in Newhaven are part of this area. Telscombe Cliffs United Reformed Church is part of the Surrey and Sussex Synod Area.

Current places of worship

Former places of worship

See also

List of demolished places of worship in East Sussex

Notes

References

Bibliography

 (Available online in 14 parts; Guide to abbreviations on page 6)

Lewes district
Lewes district
Lewes district
Places of worship